Mahmud is a given name and surname.

Mahmud and variations may also refer to:

People
 Mahmood (singer) (born 1992), Italian singer of Italian and Egyptian origin
 Mahmud (Timurid Dynasty) (born c. 1446), Timurid ruler of Herat
 Mahmud of Ghazni, (971–1030), ruler of the Turkic dynasty of Ghaznavids
 Mahmud I (disambiguation)
 Mahmud II (disambiguation)

Places
 Mahmud, Khuzestan, Iran
 Mahmud, South Khorasan, Iran

Other uses
 Mahmoud (horse), Epsom Derby winner in 1936
 Mahmoud (elephant), an elephant associated with the Year of the Elephant in Islamic history

See also
 
 Mahmudi (disambiguation)